Yūrakuchō Line may refer to:

 Tokyo Metro Yūrakuchō Line
 Seibu Yūrakuchō Line
 Tokyo Metro Fukutoshin Line, formally called the Yūrakuchō New Line